Poriadie is a village and municipality in Myjava District in the Trenčín Region of north-western Slovakia.

History
In historical records the village was first mentioned in 1955.

Geography
The municipality lies at an altitude of 425 metres and covers an area of 7.872 km². It has a population of about 695 people.

References

External links

http://www.statistics.sk/mosmis/eng/run.html

Villages and municipalities in Myjava District